Several vessels of the Royal Navy have been named Victoire (French:Victory):

 , was a lugger purchased in 1795 and listed until 1800.
  (or HMS Victor) was the French privateer schooner Victoire that the Royal Navy captured in 1797 and took into service as a fireship. The Navy sold her at the end of 1801.
 A tender named Victoire was part of a naval squadron at the Siege of Genoa (1800). Victoire may have been the privateer of two guns and 28 men that  had captured near Genoa on 29 March 1800.

Citations

References

 Royal Navy ship names